Hallvard Trætteberg (1898 in Løten – 21 November 1987 in Oslo) was the leading Norwegian heraldic artist and the expert adviser on heraldry to the Government of Norway and the Norwegian Royal Family for much of the 20th century. From about 1930 he played a central role in the renewal of public heraldry in Norway with an emphasis on simplification. He gave the Coat of arms of Norway a modern design and designed several county and municipal coats of arms, seals of the bishops of the Church of Norway, and monograms. He also wrote several books.

He was a Knight First Class of the Order of St. Olav and a member of L'Académie Internationale d'Héraldique. He was employed at the National Archives of Norway from 1924. Trætteberg was the acting national archivist of Norway from 1963 to 1964.

Gallery 
The years shown are the years in which the arms were approved, not necessarily the years in which the arms were designed. If the original drawings are signed with earlier dates, these will be indicated within parentheses. Drawings below may differ slightly from Hallvard Trætteberg's original drawings.

County arms

Municipal arms

Publications 

 Fylkesmerker. Forslag fra Norges Bondelags fylkesmerkenevnd, Oslo 1930
 Norges våbenmerker - Norske by- og adelsvåben, Kaffe Hag AS, Oslo 1933
 "Norges statssymboler inntil 1814", Historisk Tidsskrift, vol. 29, no. 8 and 9, Oslo 1933
 "Norges krone og våpen". I Festskrift til Francis Bull, Oslo 1937
 "Heraldiske farvelover", Meddelanden från Riksheraldikerämbetet, bind 7, Stockholm 1938
 "Statens forhold til heraldikken i Norge", Meddelanden från Riksheraldikerämbetet, bind 7, Stockholm 1938
 "Måne- og stjernevåpen", Meddelelser til slekten Mathiesen, Oslo 1946
 "The Coat of Arms of Norway", The American-Scandinavian Review, June 1964
 Borg i segl, mynt og våpen, Oslo 1967
 "A History of the Flags of Norway", The Flag Bulletin, (XVIII:3), 1978

Literature
Hallvard Trætteberg - Offentlig heraldikk i Norge 1921-1975 - Våpen flagg segl symboler (Exhibition catalogue)
 Hans Cappelen: Règles pour utilisation des armoiries communales en Norvège. Archivum Heraldicum (1-2) 1976. 
 Hans Cappelen: Norwegian Simplicity. The principles of recent public heraldry in Norway. The Coat of Arms, Vol. VII, No. 138, London 1988.

Footnotes

References

External links
 Europeana Heraldica, courtesy of the National Archives of Finland, where one can browse through civic heraldry of Denmark, Finland, Norway, and Sweden, with search restrictable to certain tinctures, charges, artists, etc.

1898 births
1987 deaths
People from Løten
Norwegian archivists
Heraldists
Heraldic artists